is a railway station located in the city of Tome, Miyagi Prefecture, Japan operated by the East Japan Railway Company (JR East).

Lines
Rikuzen-Toyosato Station is served by the Kesennuma Line, and is located 10.3 rail kilometers from the terminus of the line at Maeyachi Station.

Station layout
The station has a single island platform connected to the station building by a footbridge. The station is staffed.

Platforms

History
Rikuzen-Toyosato Station opened on October 24, 1968. The station was absorbed into the JR East network upon the privatization of the Japan National Railways (JNR) on April 1, 1987.

Passenger statistics
In fiscal 2016, the station was used by an average of 103 passengers daily (boarding passengers only).

Surrounding area
Rikuzen-Toyosato Post Office
former Toyosato Town Hall

See also
 List of Railway Stations in Japan

References

External links

  
  video of a train trip from Yanaizu Station to Rikuzen-Toyosato Station in 2009, passing Mitakedō Station at around 03:35 minutes without stopping.
  video of a train trip from Rikuzen-Toyosato Station to Maeyachi Station in 2009, passing Nonodake Station at around 03:35 minutes and Wabuchi Station at around 05:48 minutes, without stopping.

Railway stations in Miyagi Prefecture
Kesennuma Line
Railway stations in Japan opened in 1968
Tome, Miyagi
Stations of East Japan Railway Company